Lazar Nikolić (born 1 August 1999) is a Serbian footballer who plays as a winger or right back for Red Star Belgrade.

Career
In 2017, Nikolić joined the youth academy of Partizan, Serbia's second most successful club.

In 2018, he signed for SPAL in the Italian Serie A from Bosnian side Krupa.

In 2019, he signed for Javor Ivanjica in the Serbian top flight.

References

External links
 

Living people
1999 births
Serbian footballers
Serbian expatriate footballers
Serbia youth international footballers
Association football wingers
Association football midfielders
Sportspeople from Leskovac
FK Dubočica players
OFK Beograd players
FK Javor Ivanjica players
S.P.A.L. players
FK Krupa players
Red Star Belgrade footballers
Expatriate footballers in Italy
Serbian expatriate sportspeople in Italy